Cedar Mountain is an unincorporated community in Transylvania County, North Carolina, United States. The community is located along the Greenville Highway (US 276). Its ZIP code is 28718.

Notable people
Patricia Lynn Young ~ Nationally recognized Artist and Medicine Woman lives on Cedar Mountain At Terra Nova Center 
Cedar Mountain is home to Fritz Orr III, a four time national whitewater canoe championship title winner, and his canoe paddle making business.

References

Unincorporated communities in Transylvania County, North Carolina
Unincorporated communities in North Carolina